When the World Knows Your Name is the second album by the Scottish rock band Deacon Blue.  It was released in 1989 and attained the number 1 chart position in the UK Albums Chart.

"Real Gone Kid" was the band's first Top 10 hit single in the UK Singles Chart, reaching No. 8 in October 1988. "Wages Day", "Fergus Sings the Blues", "Love and Regret" and "Queen of the New Year" also reached the top 30 in the same listing, and all five of the album's singles made the top 10 of the Irish Singles Chart.

Leslie Mathew at AllMusic noted "Deacon Blue isn't on the mark all the time. They have their failings, notably a tendency to get overly precious and self-indulgent when trying too hard to be impressionistic on the slower songs toward album's end. But when they get it right, like on "Queen of the New Year," "Wages Day," "Real Gone Kid," and "Fergus Sings the Blues," their driving melodies and hooks are fine compensation".

Track listing
All songs written by Ricky Ross, except where noted:
  "Queen of the New Year" (Ricky Ross, James Prime) – 3:36
  "Wages Day" – 3:09
  "Real Gone Kid" – 4:03
  "Love and Regret" – 4:48
  "Circus Lights" – 4:59
  "This Changing Light" (Ricky Ross, James Prime) – 5:02
  "Sad Loved Girl" – 1:11
  "Fergus Sings the Blues" (Ricky Ross, James Prime) – 3:54
  "The World Is Lit By Lightning"  (Ricky Ross, James Prime) – 4:57
  "Silhouette" – 3:18
  "One Hundred Things" – 3:53
  "Your Constant Heart" – 4:10
  "Orphans" (Ricky Ross, Ewen Vernal) – 3:33

2012 reissue
On 22 October 2012, a deluxe remastered reissue of When the World Knows Your Name was released by Edsel Records, featuring two additional discs of bonus material as well as a DVD with bonus videos.

Personnel
Ricky Ross – vocals, guitar, piano, keyboard
Lorraine McIntosh – vocal
James Prime – keyboard 
Ewen Vernal – bass
Graeme Kelling – guitar
Dougie Vipond – drums

References

1989 albums
Deacon Blue albums
CBS Records albums
Albums produced by David Kahne
Albums produced by Warne Livesey